Gol Gohar Sirjan Football Club (Bashgah-e Futbal-e Gâl Gâher Sirjan) is an Iranian football club based in Sirjan, Iran. They currently compete in the Persian Gulf Pro League.

Gol Gohar Sirjan Football Club is the football team of the Gol Gohar Cultural Sports Club, which  includes a successful basketball team that currently compete in the Iranian Basketball Super League. Gol Gohar is known for producing many academy players and promoting them to the first team.

History
Gol Gohar Football Club was established by the Gol Gohar company in Sirjan in 1988 and competed in local leagues. In 1997, Gol Gohar Sirjan Sports Club was formally established with many divisions including the football team.

In 2007, Gol Gohar was promoted to the Azadegan League for the first time. In the 2018–19 season, they won the league and were promoted to the Persian Gulf Pro League.

Players

For recent transfers, see List of Iranian football transfers summer 2022.

Current managerial staff

Former managers
 Ghasem Shahba (- 2010) 
 Hamid Reza Kololifard (2010) 
 Farshad Pious (2010 - 2012) 
 Mehdi Mohammadi (2012) 
 Ghasem Shahba (Jun 2012 - Nov 2015) 
 Armen Gyulbudaghyants (Nov 2015 - May 2016) 
 Vinko Begović (Jul 2016 - Oct 2019)
 Amir Ghalenoei (Sep 2020 - March 2023)

Season-by-season
The table below chronicles the achievements of Gol Gohar in various competitions since 2005.

Honours
Azadegan League:
 Winners: 2018–19
league 2 (Iran):
 Runner up: 2006-07
League 3 (Iran):
 Winner: 2005-06

References

External links
 Official Website
 Fan Blog
 Players and Results
 Gol Gohar Sirjan F.C. at soccerway.com

 
Football clubs in Iran
Sport in Kerman Province
1997 establishments in Iran
Association football clubs established in 1997